The Social Revolution festival is the first architecture festival in Yaroslavl, Russia. The main theme and the motto of the festival is: "Answers of architects to the questions of the city". The festival was held twice, first from 1 to 11 May 2012 and again from 3 to 17 June 2013.

Social Revolution 2012 

The festival was focused on the idea of social housing development in Yaroslavl. The motto of the festival: "House for the price of the car". One of the festival events was an international architectural competition on the theme "Minimal" house – a dwelling house, available to most residents of Yaroslavl and adapted for life in the Russian climate. The festival included an extensive lecture program, which was devoted to various aspects of the design of social housing, as well as the problems of modern urban research in Yaroslavl. During the festival a research group was formed. Curator of the group was the head of the training programs of the Institute for Media, Architecture and Design "Strelka" Yuri Grigoryan. Group has explored urban problems, which were then submitted for public discussion with representatives of the city administration, media and invited experts and were presented to Mayor of Yaroslavl Yevgeny Urlashov.

Social Revolution 2013 

The festival was dedicated to the creation of functional objects of the urban environment for relaxing and socializing citizens, for family and youth communication, integration of different social and age groups and people with disabilities. The international architectural competition "PARKing" was a part of the Festival. The aim the competition was a creation land art objects and street furniture in the city center, in a park on the Tchaikovsky street. Best competitive projects were realized during the festival (some objects will be built in 2014). Lecture program of the festival included lectures and master classes of architects and curators of social projects in Moscow and Yaroslavl, including lecture of architectural critic, curator of Architecture award for achievements in the field of modern wooden architecture of Russia Nikolai Malinin. The parallel program of the festival includes the project "Gourmanization of the space", which aims to demonstrate to the city dwellers that the creation of attractive art objects that perform the necessary urban functions is available to the public and does not require a significant investment. This project also included an international competition "Architecture and Food".

The main events of the festival

Building of the architectural object "Stack It"

Date of the event: June 1–3, 2013.
Location: Tchaikovsky St., Yaroslavl, Russia

Lecture space of the festival: "Maximum" gallery.

Date of the event: June 9–16, 2013
Location: Soviet St. 2a, Yaroslavl, Russia
 
This event included lectures:
Nikolai Malinin, architecture critic: "Not about the house: Russian wooden architecture of public purpose in the 20th century"; 
Gregory Dainov, architect: "Architect and society. Dialogue and confrontation"; 
Natalia Mastalerzh, architect: "Center, public space. From the point system"; 
Maria Belova, architect: "Hybrids – efficiency of residential social model"; 
Natalia Stepanova, architect: "Development of the strategy of cycling infrastructure in Yaroslavl"; 
Architectural Group "ABO": "Between the trend and meaning. Environmental projects in Vologda"; 
Simon Rastorguev, architect, curator: "Grotesque in architecture on example of the international architectural competition "Gourmanization of the Space".

Construction of the playground

Event date: June 15, 2013
Location: Dobrokhotova St., Yaroslavl, Russia
Participants: Association of practicing architects "KrombiTTraksorm"

International architectural competition "Under the Bridge"

Dates: April 2 – June 15, 2014
Territory of the project: Tolbuhinsky and Dobryninsky bridges, Yaroslavl, Russia
Results: the projects of architectural objects will be presented at the exhibition and public discussion, which will be held during the Social Revolution festival 2014. Website of the competition.

International architectural competition "PARKing"

Dates: February 1 – May 1, 2013
Territory of the project: Tchaikovsky St., Yaroslavl, Russia
Results: 61 projects of architectural objects, which were presented at the exhibition, which took place on the street Tchaikovsky and in the virtual gallery of a projects. Realization of the projects – the winners of the competition will take place during the summer of 2013 and 2014.

International architectural competition "Architecture & Food"

Dates: January 10 –  April 10, 2013
Territory of the project: October Ave. 56, Yaroslavl, Russia
Results: 44 projects of the cafe veranda and pavilions were presented at the exhibition, which took place at October Ave. 56 and in the virtual gallery of projects. Projects – winners will be realized in 2014.

International architectural competition "The revolution of social housing"

Dates: from January 1 to April 29, 2012
Territory of design: Tolga settlement, Yaroslavl, Russia
Results: 54 projects of social houses are presented on permanent exhibition at the Department of Architecture YaSTU and on the competition website.

External links 
 Website of the Festival "Social Revolution" 
 Festival "Social Revolution", "Tatlin" magazine
 Architectural competition – "Social Revolution", Yaroslavl
 "Social Revolution" – Yaroslavl, "With the city on you" encyclopedia of tactical urbanism
 "A library and a garden of sound will open in Yaroslavl", "Komsomolskaya Pravda" newspaper
 "The Social Revolution of 2013", The Union of Architects of Russia
 The festival "Social Revolution" start in Yaroslavl, "City Channel"
 "Tatlin Tower, Polish architecture and inspiration", portal "Citycelebrity"
 "A house for the price of the car will be built In Yaroslavl", "Yaroslavl Region"
 "Social Revolution Festival" opened In Yaroslavl, Agency for Social Information
 Project Gallery, an international architectural competition "Architecture & Food"
 54 projects of social houses, virtual exhibition, a portal "Architecture and entropy"

Recurring events established in 2012
Russian culture
Festivals in Russia
Architecture in Russia
Architecture festivals
Tourist attractions in Yaroslavl Oblast
Yaroslavl
Culture of Yaroslavl Oblast